Glenpark Cricket Ground is a cricket ground in Greenock, Scotland.  The first recorded match held on the ground came in 1869 when Greenock played the Players of Scotland.  Scotland played their first first-class match there in 1926 against Ireland.  The ground held five further first-class matches, the last of which saw Scotland play Ireland in 1972.  Five of the first-class matches played there were between Scotland and Ireland, while another was between Scotland and the Marylebone Cricket Club.

The ground is still in use today by Greenock Cricket Club.

References

External links
Glenpark, Greenock at ESPNcricinfo
Glenpark, Greenock at CricketArchive

Cricket grounds in Scotland
Sports venues in Inverclyde
Buildings and structures in Greenock
1869 establishments in Scotland